Ercílio Turco (13 March 1938 – 30 October 2019) was a Brazilian Roman Catholic bishop.

Turco was born in Brazil and was ordained to the priesthood in 1963. He served as bishop of the Roman Catholic Diocese of Limeira, Brazil, from 1989 to 2002 and as bishop of the Roman Catholic Diocese of Osasco, Brazil, from 2002 to 2014.

References

1938 births
2019 deaths
21st-century Roman Catholic bishops in Brazil
20th-century Roman Catholic bishops in Brazil
Roman Catholic bishops of Limeira
Roman Catholic bishops of Osasco